Harchibald (foaled in 1999 in France) is a retired French-bred, Irish-trained thoroughbred racehorse.

Background
Harchibald was sired by the stallion Perugino out of the mare Dame D’Harvard. He was owned by DP Sharkey, trained by Noel Meade and predominantly ridden by Paul Carberry.

Racing career
Harchibald started racing as a three-year-old in February 2002 in which he participated in the Prix Sengali-Carnaval. Despite this being his first race, he took home first place.  Harchibald’s first notable win came in November 2004 at Punchestown Racecourse near Naas, County Kildare, in Ireland where he won the Mongey Communications Morgiana Hurdle, a Grade 2 National Hunt race.  Following his first Grade 2 win, Harchibald and jockey Paul Carberry went on to win the 2004 Fighting Fifth Hurdle at Newcastle Racecourse in Newcastle, England where he beat out Inglis Drever by 2 lengths. Following his win in the Fighting Fifth Hurdle, Harchibald went on to beat Rooster Booster in the 2004 Christmas Hurdle.
Had he gone on to win the Champion Hurdle, Harchibald would have become just the second horse since Kribensis in 1989/90 to win the Fighting Fifth Hurdle, Christmas Hurdle, and Champion Hurdle in the same racing season.  However, Harchibald did not win the race, instead losing to Hardy Eustace by just a fraction of a length.

Harchibald went on to post wins in the 2007 Fighting Fifth Hurdle and the 2008 Christmas Hurdle – his second win for each race.  His 2008 win at the Christmas Hurdle denied Punjabi a chance to win the £1,000,000 bonus put up by WBX for winning the Triple Crown of Hurdling.

In his career, Harchibald has participated in 48 races and tallied 14 wins, 11 places and 5 shows, with five of his wins coming in Grade 1 races.  As of September 2009, his overall winning percentage is over 30%.  Paul Carberry has been atop Harchibald for 9 of those 14 wins.

Retirement
Harchibald was retired in December 2009, following a brief stint as a chaser when he finished second to Sizing Europe on his only try over fences. He will remain with his trainer Noel Meade in Tu Va Stables near Navan, Co. Meath.

References

1999 racehorse births
Thoroughbred family 11-f
Racehorses bred in France
Racehorses trained in Ireland